Giardi is a surname. Notable people with the surname include:

Gianfranco Giardi (born 1949), Sammarinese sports shooter
Kendra Giardi
Mattia Giardi (born 1991), Sammarinese footballer
Osvalda Giardi (1932–2019), Italian high jumper and pentathlete
Phil Giardi

See also
Girardi (disambiguation)